The Women's long jump event  at the 2004 IAAF World Indoor Championships was held on March 6–7.

Medalists

Results

Qualification
Qualifying perf. 6.62 (Q) or 8 best performers (q) advanced to the Final.

Final

References
Results

Long
Long jump at the World Athletics Indoor Championships
2004 in women's athletics